Dolichopareias is an extinct genus of prehistoric amphibian.

See also

 Prehistoric amphibian
 List of prehistoric amphibians

References

External links 
2D, stereoscopic, and 3D imagery of the type specimen of Dolichopareias disjectus

Adelospondyls
Taxa named by D. M. S. Watson
Fossil taxa described in 1928
Carboniferous amphibians of Europe